Bookminders is a Pittsburgh-based company providing outsourced accounting and bookkeeping services for small businesses and nonprofit organizations, and is an innovator in utilizing a home-based professional workforce.

The company has devised a system that compensates its home-based professionals based on the volume of transactions processed.  The incentive system was inspired by a 60 Minutes segment on Lincoln Electric, a company that successfully used employee incentives to manufacture world class products.

Bookminders has a licensing program for accountants who want to build a large-scale bookkeeping practice. The program consists of Marketing & Sales Programs, Pricing & Compensation Systems and Service Delivery Processes. They also provide training programs, help systems and reference materials to address the unique challenges of the industry.

The company developed the concept of the "Cottage Corporation."  A cottage corporation has its employees working from home and its corporate headquarters in an office building, unlike a home-based business which has its main office in a home.

Bookminders has been featured in media outlets including Philadelphia Business Journal, Pittsburgh Business Times, Smart Business Network, TEQ, Intuit Advisor Spotlight,  Accounting Today and The Wall Street Journal.

History

In 1991, Tom Joseph founded Bookminders with the idea that he could attract top-tier talent if he offered a flexible work environment. It is a concept he devised when implementing an accounting system for his father's business. His sister agreed to act as the company's bookkeeper, but only if she could do most of the work from home. They created an arrangement in which she would go onsite each week to collect their financial data but did the data entry from home when her schedule allowed. The seed of an idea was planted in Joseph's mind. While conventional home-based businesses usually have a goal of growing beyond the home, Joseph's goal was to grow Bookminders into a company of home-based accountants.

The company expanded to Philadelphia in 2006. In 2017, it expanded its Delaware Valley presence with the opening of its Cherry Hill, New Jersey office. Since then, it has opened offices in Baltimore, Maryland and Austin, Texas.

Awards

Bookminders was recognized by the Pittsburgh Business Times in their "50 Best Places to Work" listing, honored by the Pittsburgh Human Resources Association for their unique employment model, and was presented "Balance Award - Company of the Year" by the American Society of Women Accountants for demonstrating a commitment to work/life balance. They were also recognized as "Pennsylvania Home-Based Business Champion" for outstanding performance by the U.S. Small Business Administration and among Pittsburgh's 100 Fastest Growing Private Companies by the Pittsburgh Business Times in 1997, 1998, 2000, 2001, 2002, 2003, and 2004.

References

External links
 Bookminders official site

Business services companies established in 1991
Business services companies of the United States
1991 establishments in Pennsylvania